Ansonia albomaculata, also known as the white-lipped slender toad and whitebelly stream toad, is a species of toad in the family Bufonidae. It is endemic to the island of Borneo and can be found in Sabah and Sarawak (Malaysia), Brunei, and northern Kalimantan (Indonesia).

Description
The overall appearance is slender. The head is wider than it is long. The snout is truncate. The tympanum is visible but partly concealed by skin. The finger tips are rounded. The fingers are long and have rudimentary webbing. The toes are webbed and have small rounded disks at their tips. A distinct ridge runs along inner margin of the tarsus. The dorsum is dark brown and warty, albeit the warts being low. There is a light spot on the upper jaw, below the eye.

Tadpoles probably belonging to this species are small, total length . They have an oval body that is dorsoventrally depressed and a bluntly rounded tail.

Habitat and conservation
Adults are mostly terrestrial and disperse widely over the rainforest floor. They breed in small, clear, rocky-bottomed streams. The tadpoles live in torrents where they cling to rocks and feed on lithophytes.

Ansonia albomaculata is known from widely scattered localities and is generally considered rare, although it can be abundant at some places. It does not adapt to habitat modification and is threatened by forest loss and fragmentation caused by conversion of forests to rubber and oil palm plantations. These also negatively affect the larval habitat through siltation and through eutrophication caused by chemical fertilizers. However, it is present in several protected areas.

References

albomaculata
Endemic fauna of Borneo
Amphibians of Brunei
Amphibians of Borneo
Amphibians of Indonesia
Amphibians of Malaysia
Amphibians described in 1960
Taxa named by Robert F. Inger
Taxonomy articles created by Polbot
Borneo lowland rain forests